Ahmad Ajab (born 13 May 1984) is a Kuwaiti footballer. After starting playing for Al-Sahel he moved to Al-Qadisia in July 2007.

Career
After moving to his new club, he was quickly crowned as the top scorer in 2007 Kuwaiti Premier League and was called up for the national team where he scored a hat-trick on his debut against Lebanon, he came from the bench after 50 minutes gone and the scoreline was 2–0 to Lebanon it finished with his hat-trick 2-3. He is currently in some fierce competition to be the World top scorer and Asia's Best Player of the Year. He helped his team to reach the second round of the AFC champions league.

International goals
Scores and results list Kuwait's goal tally first.

Personal life
Ahmad brothers, Khalid and Faisal, was also footballers.

External links

1984 births
Living people
Kuwaiti footballers
Kuwaiti expatriate footballers
Kuwait international footballers
Qadsia SC players
2011 AFC Asian Cup players
Al-Shabab FC (Riyadh) players
Sportspeople from Kuwait City
Saudi Professional League players
Expatriate footballers in Saudi Arabia
Kuwaiti expatriate sportspeople in Saudi Arabia

Association football forwards
Al-Sahel SC (Kuwait) players
Al-Shabab SC (Kuwait) players
Kuwait Premier League players
Al-Nasr SC (Kuwait) players
Al Salmiya SC players